Damascus is an unincorporated community in Cullman County, Alabama, United States.

References

Unincorporated communities in Cullman County, Alabama
Unincorporated communities in Alabama